Ahmadov (masculine) or Ahmadova (feminine), is an Azerbaijani surname, meaning "son of Ahmad". Notable people with the surname include:

Aslan Ahmadov (born 1973), Russian photographer and artist
Emin Ahmadov (born 1986), Azerbaijani sport wrestler
Haji Ahmadov (born 1993), Azerbaijani footballer
Rashad Ahmadov (born 1981), Azerbaijani taekwondo practitioner
Riad Ahmadov (1956–1992), Azerbaijani military officer
Tarlan Ahmadov (born 1971), Azerbaijani footballer
Vahid Ahmadov (born 1947), Azerbaijani politician

Azerbaijani-language surnames
Patronymic surnames
Surnames from given names